Dr. M. may refer to:
Dr. M (film), a 1990 film starring Andrew McCarthy
Dr M or Mahathir bin Mohamad, fourth and seventh Prime Minister of Malaysia
Dr. M, the main antagonist of Sly 3: Honor Among Thieves

See also
Doctor Manhattan, a DC comic book superhero